

This is a list of games for the Commodore Amiga computer system, organised alphabetically by name. See Lists of video games for related lists.

I

I Ludicrus
Iceball
Icerunner
Ikari Warriors
Ilyad
Immortal, The
Impact
Imperator: Master Of Rome
Imperium
Impossamole
Impossible Mission II
Impossible Mission 2025
Incredible Crash Dummies, The
Incredible Shrinking Sphere
Indiana Jones and the Fate of Atlantis
Indiana Jones and the Last Crusade: The Action Game
Indiana Jones and the Last Crusade: The Graphic Adventure
Indianapolis 500: The Simulation
Indoor Sports
Industrial Rebound
Indy Heat
Inferior
Infestation
Infidel
Innocent Until Caught
Insanity Fight
Insects in Space
Intact
International Karate
International Karate +
International Rugby Challenge
International Soccer
International Soccer Challenge
International Truck Racing
Interphase
Into the Eagle's Nest
Invasion
Invest
Iron Lord
Ishar
Ishar 2
Ishar 3
Ishido: The Way of Stones
It Came from the Desert
Italy '90 Soccer
Ivanhoe

J

J.R.R. Tolkien's The Lord of the Rings, Vol. I
Jack Nicklaus' Greatest 18 Holes of Major Championship Golf
Jaguar XJ220
Jaktar: Der Elfenstein
James Pond
James Pond 2
James Pond 3: Operation Starfish
Japanese, British & German Forces
Jaws
Jeanne d'Arc
Jet
Jet Pilot
Jet Set Willy II
Jetsons, The
Jetstrike
Jim Power in Mutant Planet
Jimmy White's 'Whirlwind' Snooker
Jimmy's Fantastic Journey
Jinxter
Joan of Arc: Siege and the Sword (1989), a war strategy game released by Brøderbund
Joe & Mac
John Barnes European Football
Judge Dredd
JUG
Jumping Jack Son
Jungle Strike
Jurassic Park
Jurajski Sen

K

K240
Kaiser
Kalashnikov
Kamikaze
The Karate Kid Part II: The Computer Game
Karate King
Karate Master
Kargon
Karting Grand Prix
Kampfgruppe
Kang Fu
KAPITAlist
Katakis
Kayden Garth
Keef the Thief
Kellogg's Game
Kelly X
Kengi
Kengilon
Kennedy Approach
Kenny Dalglish Soccer Match
Keys to Maramon
KGB
Khalaan
Kick Off
Kick Off 2
Kick Off 2 competition version
KickIt: A Day for the Laiban
Kid Chaos
Kid Gloves
Kid Gloves 2
Kikstart II
Kikugi
Killerball
Killing Cloud
Killing Game Show
Killing Machine
King of Chicago
Kingdoms of England II: Vikings, Fields of Conquest
Kingdoms of Germany
Kingmaker
King's Bounty
King's Quest: Quest for the Crown
King's Quest II: Romancing the Throne
King's Quest III: To Heir Is Human
King's Quest IV: The Perils of Rosella
King's Quest V: Absence Makes the Heart Go Yonder!
King's Quest VI: Heir Today, Gone Tomorrow
Kiro's Quest
Klax
Knight Force
Knightmare (1987 video game)
Knightmare (1991 video game)
Knights
Knights and Merchants
Knights of the Crystallion
Knights of the Sky
Knoorkie the Pig
Kosmos
Kristal, The
Krusty's Fun House
Krypton Egg
Kult
Kwik Snax

L

Labyrinth of Time, The
Lamborghini
Lamborghini American Challenge
Lancaster
Land of Genesis
Larrie and the Ardies
Larrie at the Castle
Laser Squad
Last Action Hero
Last Battle
Last Ninja, The
Last Ninja 2
Last Ninja 3
Last Soldier, The
Leaderboard
Leading Lap
Leander
Leather Goddesses of Phobos
Leavin' Teramis
LED Storm
Legend
Legend of Faerghail
Legend of Kyrandia, The
Legend of Lothian
Legend of Rome
Legend of the Lost
Legends of Valour
Legion of Dawn
Leisure Suit Larry in the Land of the Lounge Lizards
Leisure Suit Larry Goes Looking for Love (in Several Wrong Places)
Leisure Suit Larry III: Passionate Patti in Pursuit of the Pulsating Pectorals
Leisure Suit Larry 5: Passionate Patti Does a Little Undercover Work
Lemmings
Lemmings 2: The Tribes
Les Manley in: Search for the King
Lethal Action
Lethal Weapon
Lethal Xcess
Leviathan
Liberation: Captive 2
Life & Death
Light Corridor, The
Limes & Napoleon
Line of Fire
Links
Lionheart
Lion King, The
Litil Divil
Little Computer People
Little Dragon
Little Puff in Dragonland
Liverpool
Livingstone
Livingstone 2
Llamatron
Logic
Logical
Logo
Lollypop
Lombard RAC Rally
Loopz
Loom
Lords of Chaos
Lords of Doom
Lords of the Realm
Lords of the Rising Sun
Lords of Time
Lorna
Lost Dutchman Mine
Lost New York
Lost Patrol
Lost Vikings, The
Lost'n'Maze
Lothar Matthäus Soccer
Lotus Esprit Turbo Challenge
Lotus Turbo Challenge 2
Lotus 3: The Ultimate Challenge
Lupo Alberto
Lure of the Temptress
Lurking Horror, The

M

M.C. Kids
M1 Tank Platoon
Mad News
Mad Professor Mariarti
Mad TV
Madden NFL
Maelstrom
Mafdet
Mag!
Magic Ball
Magic Boy
Magic Fly
Magic Marble
Magic Pockets
Magic Serpent
Magicland Dizzy
Major Motion
Manager, The
Manchester United
Manchester United 2
Manchester United 3
Manhunter: New York
Manhunter 2: San Francisco
Maniac Mansion
Manic Miner
Manix
Marble Madness
Marblelous
Marblelous 2
Marvin's Marvellous Adventures
Master Axe
Master Ninja
Masterblazer
Matrix Marauders
Maupiti Island
MAX Rally
Mean 18
Mean Arenas
MechCombat
MechForce
Medieval Warriors
Mega Lo Mania
Mega Motion
Mega Phoenix
Mega Twins
Mega Typhoon
Megaball
Megaball 4
Megablast
Megafortress
Mega Lo Mania
MegaTraveller 1: The Zhodani Conspiracy
MegaTraveller 2: Quest for the Ancients
Menace
Mercenary
Mercenary 3
Merchant Colony
Metal Law
Metal Masters
Metal Mutant
Michael Jackson's Moonwalker
Mickey Mouse
Micro Machines
Microcosm
MicroProse Golf
MicroProse Soccer
Midnight Resistance
Midwinter
Midwinter II: Flames of Freedom
Miecze Valdgira II: Władca Gór
Mig 29 Soviet Fighter
MIG-29M Super Fulcrum
Might and Magic II: Gates to Another World
Might and Magic III: Isles of Terra
Mighty Bomb Jack
Mike the Magic Dragon
Millennium 2.2
Mindfighter
Mind Force
Mind Forever Voyaging, A
Mind Run
Mind Walker
Mindroll
Mindshadow
Minos
Missiles over Xerion
Mission Elevator
Mobile Warfare
Moebius: The Orb of Celestial Harmony
Monkey Island 2
Monopoly
Monster Business
Monsters of Terror
Monty Python's Flying Circus
Moon City
Moonbase
Moonblaster
Moonfall
Moonmist
Moonshine Racers
Moonstone: A Hard Days Knight
Morph
Mortal Kombat
Mortal Kombat II
Mortville Manor (Le Manoir de Mortevielle)
Mot
Motorbike Madness
Motorhead
Mr. Blobby
Mr. Do! Run Run!
Mr. Heli
Mr. Nutz: Hoppin' Mad
Munsters, The
Murder!
Myst
Mystical
Myth

N

'Nam: 1965-1975
Napalm: The Crimson Crisis
Napoleon
Napoleon vs. The Evil Monarchies: The Battle of Austerlitz
National Hunt
Naughty Ones
Navy Moves
Navy Seals
Nebulus
Nebulus 2
Necronom
Neighbours
Nemac IV
Netherworld
Neuromancer
Never Mind
New York Warriors
New Zealand Story
Nick Faldo's Championship Golf
Nicky
Nicky 2
Nigel Mansell's Grand Prix
Nigel Mansell's World Championship
Night Hunter
Night Shift
Nightbreed: Action Game
Nightlong
Ninja
Ninja Mission
Ninja Rabbits
Ninja Remix
Ninja Spirit
Nippon Safes Inc
Nitro
No Buddies Land
No Excuses
No Exit
No Greater Glory
No Second Prize
Nobunaga's Ambition
Nord and Bert Couldn't Make Head or Tail of It
North & South
Nova 9: The Return of Gir Draxon
Nuclear War
Nuxelia
NY Warriors

O

Oath, The
Obitus
Obliterator
Obsession Pinball
Odyssey
Oh No! More Lemmings
OloFight
OM Super Football
Omega
Omni-Play Horse Racing
Omnicron Conspiracy
OnEscapee
On the Road
One on One: Dr. J vs. Larry Bird
One Step Beyond
Onslaught
Ooops Up!
Operation Com.Bat
Operation Neptun
Operation Stealth
Operation Thunderbolt
Operation Wolf
Orbit 2000
Oriental Games
Ork
Oscar
Osiris
OsWALD
Out to Lunch
Out Run
Out Run Europa
Outlands
Outzone
Overdrive
Overlord
Overkill & Lunar-C
Oxxonian
Oxyd

References

List: I-O
Amiga: I-O